"Feelin' Alright?", also known as "Feeling Alright", is a song written by Dave Mason of the English rock band Traffic for their eponymous 1968 album Traffic. It was also released as a single, and failed to chart in both the UK and the US, but it did reach a bubbling under position of #123 on the Billboard Hot 100. Joe Cocker performed a more popular rendition of the song that did chart in the U.S. Both Traffic's and Cocker's versions appear in the 2012 movie Flight. The song had also been featured in the 2000 film Duets, sung by Huey Lewis.

Traffic version credits
Dave Mason – lead vocal, guitar
Chris Wood – tenor saxophone, backing vocal
Steve Winwood – piano, bass, backing vocal
Jim Capaldi – drums, percussion, backing vocal

Joe Cocker version

Joe Cocker recorded it to lead off his debut album With a Little Help from My Friends in 1969. He also amended the title of the original from "Feelin' Alright?" to "Feeling Alright". Released as a single in 1969, it reached #69 on the US singles chart, and #49 in Canada. In a 1972 re-release, it reached even higher to #33 on the same chart, and #35 in Canada. A live version was included in his double album Mad Dogs & Englishmen of 1970. Cocker performed a 'duet' of this song with John Belushi imitating Cocker on the third episode of Saturday Night Live's second season, which aired on October 2, 1976. Cocker also performed the song with Huey Lewis on Jimmy Kimmel Live!, which aired on 19 July 2012.

Joe Cocker version credits
Joe Cocker – vocals
Artie Butler – piano
David Bennett Cohen – guitar
Carol Kaye – bass
Paul Humphrey – drums
Laudir de Oliveira – percussion 
Merry Clayton, Brenda Holloway, Patrice Holloway – backing vocals

Other versions
It has also been recorded by:
 1969 - Three Dog Night (as the B-side to "Celebrate"), Rare Earth, David Ruffin, and Rustix. Mongo Santamaría released it on Atlantic Records in November 1969; his version titled "Feeling Alright" reached #95 on the US Billboard Hot 100.
 1970 - Lulu, Lou Rawls, Chairmen of the Board, Hubert Laws, The 5th Dimension.
 1971 - Gladys Knight & the Pips; The Jackson 5 with lead vocals by Jermaine, Marlon, Michael and Jackie Jackson. Later they recorded the song again with Diana Ross. Wade Marcus, Maceo Parker, Jr. Walker & the All Stars. 
 1971 - Grand Funk Railroad released it in May 1971 as "Feelin' Alright," which reached #54 on the Billboard Hot 100. It was included in the band's 1971 album Survival.
1973 - Isaac Hayes, The Undisputed Truth, and Mother's Finest.
1978 - The Bar-Kays.
1985 - A Little Milton recording from 1970 released on the album The Checker Days 1961-1970.
1992 - Paul Weller on the Above the Clouds EP in 1992.
1994 - Kate Ceberano recorded a version for her 1994 album, Kate Ceberano and Friends.
1997 - Craig Chaquiço (guitarist) in the album Once in a Blue Universe.
2001 - Juliette Lewis for the closing song in the movie Picture Claire.
2003 - Gail Ann Dorsey on the album Rude Blue
2006 - Ohio Players as a bonus track in Pain album reissue.
2010 - Nuno Mindelis in the album Free Blues.
2016 - Lauren Bush on All My Treasures.
2020 - Dave Mason And The Quarantines (Pandemic release) (Featuring Mick Fleetwood, Sammy Hagar, Michael Mcdonald, Pat Simmons, John McFee, Tom Johnston)
2022 - Elle King on DreamWorks Animation's The Bad Guys.

Other artists who released their covers are Freddie King, Widespread Panic and The Black Crowes. A steel drum version by Trinidad Oil Company was reissued on the dancefloor jazz compilation Blue Juice 2.

References

1968 songs
1968 singles
1969 singles
1971 singles
1972 singles
Songs written by Dave Mason
Traffic (band) songs
Joe Cocker songs
Grand Funk Railroad songs
Three Dog Night songs
Rare Earth (band) songs
Lulu (singer) songs
Lou Rawls songs
Chairmen of the Board songs
The 5th Dimension songs
Gladys Knight & the Pips songs
The Jackson 5 songs
Diana Ross songs
Isaac Hayes songs
Ohio Players songs
Freddie King songs
The Black Crowes songs
Song recordings produced by Jimmy Miller
United Artists Records singles
A&M Records singles
Atlantic Records singles
Capitol Records singles
MCA Records singles
Island Records singles
Regal Zonophone Records singles
Dave Mason songs